Brevisana brevis, known as the shrill thorntree cicada, is a cicada found in Africa and is the loudest insect on record. It has been recorded producing sounds with pressure levels of 106.7 decibels at a distance of 50 cm.

References

Hemiptera of Africa